Dongkya or Dongkhya range, is a mountain range in the lower Himalayas that forms the eastern border of Sikkim, currently a state of India. Its northern tip extends to Dongkha La, and as it moves southwards, sometimes referred to as the Chola range, it is cut by Cho La, Yak La, Nathu La and Jelep La passes.

Dongkya range and Chola range 
S. K. Samanta explains in the Indian Journal of Landscape Systems and Ecological Studies,

Political importance 
It was established as the border between Sikkim and Tibet's Chumbi Valley by the 1890 Convention of Calcutta reached between British India and Qing China. The Convention deemed the Dongkya Range to end at Mount Gipmochi at the southern end, which was defined as the trijunction between India, Tibet and Bhutan. However the Doklam plateau at the southern end gives rise to complications and the present day border dispute between Bhutan and China.

Dongkya Range is politically important, however S. G. Burrard, H. H. Hayden and A. Heron comment that while Dongkya Range is politically important, "but from a Himalayan point of view too great a topographical emphasis was given to them upon maps".

Passes and peaks

Passes 

 Dongkha La
 Cho La (Chola range)
 Yak La (Chola range)
 Nathu La  (Chola range)
 Jelep La (Chola range)

Mountains 

 Pauhunri (7,128 meters)
 Chugalung (5,759 meters)
 Dopendikang (5,359 meters)

Gallery

References and notes 
Notes

Citations

Bibliography

Further reading 

Mountains of Sikkim